Walwari is a political party in the French overseas department and region of French Guiana, founded in 1992 by Christiane Taubira and her husband Roland Delannon.

Representation
The party had one seat in the French National Assembly in the group of the Socialist Party (PS); it was held by Taubira from 1993 to 2012 who also served as a Member of the European Parliament (MEP) from 1994 to 1999. It is aligned with the Radical Party of the Left (PRG) and has arranged local electoral alliances with the radical independentist Decolonization and Social Emancipation Movement (MDES).

References

1992 establishments in French Guiana
Political parties in French Guiana
Socialism in French Guiana
Socialist parties in France